Novokirsanovka is a rural locality (a village) and the administrative center of Rusanovskoye Rural Settlement, Ternovsky District, Voronezh Oblast, Russia. The population was 408 as of 2010. There are 8 streets.

Geography 
Novokirsanovka is located 17 km south of Ternovka (the district's administrative centre) by road. Rzhavets is the nearest rural locality.

References 

Rural localities in Ternovsky District